The Chrysler 200C EV is a plug-in hybrid electric concept car built by the U.S. automaker Chrysler.

Overview
The vehicle was based on the shortened Chrysler LX platform.

P245/45R20 front and rear tires.

The interior incorporates uConnect features controlled via a panoramic multimedia touch screen. It includes a "teen mode" which warns of erratic driving or going out of a specified range, and limits the maximum speed.

The vehicle was unveiled in 2009 North American International Auto Show.

Design
The exterior design was led by Nick Malachowski. The interior was designed by Chrysler LLC's Advance Interior Design Studio, led by Ryan Patrick Joyce. The vehicle flooring was inspired by a Zen rock garden.

References

External links
allpar: 2009 Chrysler 200C Concept Car

200C
200C EV
Plug-in hybrid vehicles
Cars introduced in 2009
Mid-size cars
Sedans